Cañon City Daily Record is a daily newspaper published in Cañon City, Colorado. It carries local, regional, national and world news. It is owned by Prairie Mountain Publishing, a subsidiary of MediaNews Group, who purchased the paper in 2011.

History
The Cañon City Daily Record was acquired in 1978 by Ed and Ruth Lehman, who had previously bought the Longmont Times-Call (1957) and the Loveland Reporter-Herald (1967). Lehman Communication was continued by the next generation of the Lehman family. The newspaper group was expanded with the Erie Review, Lafayette News, Louisville Times and Superior Observer that were combined into the Colorado Hometown Weekly.

Prairie Mountain Publishing acquired Lehman Communication in 2011.

References

External links
 Official website

Newspapers published in Colorado
Cañon City, Colorado